Antonio Mariano Armijo (1804–1850) was a Spanish explorer and merchant who is famous for leading the first commercial caravan party between Abiquiú, Nuevo México and San Gabriel Mission, Alta California in 1829–1830. His route, the southernmost and most direct, is known as the Armijo Route of the Old Spanish Trail.

Abiquiú was the starting point and eastern terminus of the original route of the Old Spanish Trail. Though segments of an overland route between the Spanish colonies of Nuevo México and Alta California had been blazed decades earlier, Armijo was the first to pioneer a complete route that traveled the entire length. Armijo traveled with sixty mounted men and a caravan of pack animals carrying blankets and other trade goods to barter for mules in California. The caravan left Abiquiú on 7 November 1829 and made the journey to the San Gabriel Mission in what is now San Gabriel, California in eighty-six days, arriving on 31 January 1830. He returned by the same route in 56 days, leaving 1 March and arriving on 25 April 1830. Unlike the other routes of the Old Spanish Trail, Armijo's route was documented day by day, although in a very brief report listing dates and stopping places, with few other details and no distances recorded. The report was submitted to the governor of Nuevo México, José Antonio Cháves, and published by the Mexican government on 19 June 1830.

References

External links
 PHOTO #: WY0002a, CAPTION: Antonio Mariano Armijo on horse Fuego (Smokey) 1851. This pencil sketch by J. Lundquist. Antonio Mariano is oldest son of Jose Francisco Armijo and; Jesus Maria Armijo. See also: Rulofson Coll. No. RR-244L Year: 1851 from solanohistory.org accessed 30 October 2015.

1804 births
1850 deaths
Mexican people of Spanish descent
Pre-statehood history of California
History of Mexico
1829 in Mexico
1830 in Mexico
History of New Mexico
History of Nevada
History of Utah
History of Clark County, Nevada
People from Santa Fe, New Mexico
Spanish explorers of North America
Explorers of California
Explorers of New Mexico